

Šťastný is a Czech and Slovak surname which literally means "happy". The feminine form of the surname is Šťastná.

Spelling variants include Stiastny/Stiastna, Stiasny/Stiasna, Stiassny/Stiassna, etc..

The surname may refer to:

In sports:
 The Šťastný family of ice hockey:
 First generation (all brothers):
 Marián Šťastný (born 1953), Slovak–Canadian winger
 Peter Šťastný (born 1956), Slovak–Canadian Hall of Fame centre; also notable as a politician in Slovakia
 Anton Šťastný (born 1959), Slovak–Canadian winger
 Second generation (both sons of Peter):
 Yan Stastny (Ján Šťastný) (born 1982), Canadian–American centre
 Paul Stastny (Pavol Šťastný) (born 1985), Canadian–American centre
 Andrej Šťastný (born 1991), Slovak professional ice hockey player (not related to the above family)
 Bohuslav Šťastný (born 1949), retired Czech professional ice hockey player (also unrelated to the Slovak Šťastný family)
 František Šťastný (1927 − 2000), Czech Grand Prix motorcycle racer
 Jarmila Šťastná, Czech speed skater
 Jiří Šťastný, Czech basketball player
 Leopold Šťastný (1911 − 1996), Slovak football (soccer) player and trainer
Jan Šťastný (canoeist) (born 1970), Czech canoeist

In the arts:
 Bohumil Šťastný (1905 − 1991), Czech photographer
 Jan Šťastný (violoncellist) (c. 1764 − ?), Czech composer and cellist
 Jan Šťastný (actor) (born 1965), Czech actor
 Marie Šťastná (born 1981), Czech poet
 Vladimír Šťastný (1841 − 1910), Czech priest and poet

Stiasny 

 Franz Stiasny (1881 - 1941), Austrian medal maker
 Edmund Stiasny, the namesake of the Stiasny's method for analysis of tannins

Stiassny 

 Wilhelm Stiassny (1842, Preßburg - 1910 Bad Ischl), a Jewish Hungarian-Austrian architect
 Ignaz Stiaßny (1849 - 1909), Austrian theatre director and -agent
 Robert Stiassny (1862, Vienna - 1917), Austrian art historian
 Felix Stiassny (1867 - 1938), Austrian industrialist
 Rudolf Viktor Stiaßny (pseudonym: Viktor Staal; 1909, Frankstadt, Moravia - 1982), Moravian-Austrian actor
 Alfred Stiassny, Austrian Professor of the Wirtschaftsuniversität Wien
 Melanie Stiassny (b.1953), German ichthyologist

References

See also 
 Ščasný (other form)
 Szczęsny (Polish form)
 Glück

Czech-language surnames
Slovak-language surnames